Ginevra Mugnaini (born 2 April 1973) is an Italian former professional tennis player.

Mugnaini reached a best singles ranking of 170 and featured in the main draw of the 1993 San Marino Open.

On the ITF Circuit, she won two $25,000 titles, at Sezze and Cascais.

ITF finals

Singles: 4 (2–2)

Doubles: 2 (0–2)

References

External links
 
 

1973 births
Living people
Italian female tennis players
20th-century Italian women